Rayat-Bahra University (RBU), a private university located in Mohali, Punjab, India. The university was established in 2014 under The Rayat-Bahra University Act, 2014.

References

External links

Universities in Punjab, India
2014 establishments in Punjab, India
Educational institutions established in 2014
Private universities in India
Sahibzada Ajit Singh Nagar district